The 2005 Asian Men's Youth Handball Championship (1st tournament) took place in Bangkok from 26 June–2 July. It acts as the Asian qualifying tournament for the 2005 Men's Youth World Handball Championship in Qatar.

Draw

Preliminary round

Group A

Group B

Placement 5th–8th

7th/8th

5th/6th

Final round

Semifinals

Bronze medal match

Gold medal match

Final standing

References
www.handball.jp(  2009-09-04)

International handball competitions hosted by Thailand
Asian Mens Youth Handball Championship, 2005
Asia
Asian Handball Championships